Konstantinos Papadopoulos (born 18 December 1986) is a retired Greek football midfielder.

References

1976 births
Living people
Atromitos F.C. players
Ethnikos Asteras F.C. players
Apollon Smyrnis F.C. players
Asteras Tripolis F.C. players
Panetolikos F.C. players
Korinthos F.C. players
Fostiras F.C. players
Super League Greece players
Association football midfielders
Footballers from Athens
Greek footballers